Neah Evans (born 1 August 1990) is a Scottish professional racing cyclist specialising in track endurance events.  Representing Great Britain at the Olympic Games, European Championships and World Championships, and Scotland at the Commonwealth Games, Evans is an Olympic medalist in the team pursuit, a World points race champion, a six-time European champion in team pursuit (4), individual pursuit and the madison, and a Commonwealth Games medalist.

In June 2021, Evans was selected as part of Team GB's cycling squad for the postponed 2020 Tokyo Olympics where she won a silver medal in the team pursuit event. In 2022, she won a gold medal in the points  race at the Track Cycling World Championships.

Evans rode for Podium Ambition Pro Cycling.

Biography
Evans was born in 1990. Her parents are Malcolm and Ros Evans. Her mother is an international orienteer and fell runner who competed in cross-country skiing at the 1984 Winter Olympics in Sarajevo. Neah Evans lives in Cuminestown near Turriff. She and her parents live in Aberdeenshire in north-east Scotland.

She worked as a veterinary surgeon before becoming a full-time athlete in 2017. Evans raced in every round of the Revolution series as she helped Podium Ambition win the overall Elite women's title. Evans notably placed her team first in round three despite being on her own; and beat Laura Kenny in the omnium event in London. At the London 6 days event, Evans won one of the ten races to finish second in the women's omnium to Katie Archibald. Evans was selected to represent Britain at the Cali World Cup event in 2017.

At the opening round of the 2017–18 World Cup track series, Evans won the scratch race only to be relegated to fourth after being deemed to have gained an advantage by going on to the track's blue strip (côte d'azur). Evans was part of the team pursuit that claimed the bronze medal in Pruszkow. She also won a solo bronze medal for Scotland in the points race at the 2018 Commonwealth Games.

Evans was chosen to be part of Team GB's cycling squad for the postponed 2020 Tokyo Olympics where she is joined by Katie Archibald, Elinor Barker, Laura Kenny and Josie Knight for the endurance races. The team won the silver medal in the women's team pursuit event.

At the 2022 British National Track Championships in Newport, Wales she won two British titles after winning the pursuit and points events. She subsequently won the British National Madison Championships with Laura Kenny in April.

At the 2022 Commonwealth Games in July, Evans won points race silver and individual pursuit bronze.

Evans won two more national titles at the 2023 British Cycling National Track Championships, bringing her total to 7, she won the individual pursuit for the second time and the points race for the third time.

Personal life
Evans' boyfriend is the cyclist Jonathan Wale. One of her brothers, Donald Evans, won gold for Scotland at the 2014 Commonwealth Rowing Championships, bronze of GB at the World University Rowing Championships, and held an indoor rowing world record between 2016-2018.

Major results

2016
 1st  Derny, National Track Championships
 2nd Omnium, Six Days of London
2017
 1st Team pursuit, Grand Prix Poland
 National Track Championships
2nd Scratch
3rd Individual pursuit
3rd Keirin
3rd Points
3rd Team pursuit
 3rd Team pursuit, UCI Track World Cup, Pruszkow
2018
 1st  Team pursuit, UEC European Track Championships
 Commonwealth Games
2nd  Scratch
3rd  Points
2019
 1st  Team pursuit, UEC European Track Championships
 1st  Points, National Track Championships
2020
 UEC European Track Championships
1st  Individual pursuit
1st  Team pursuit
 2nd  Team pursuit, UCI Track World Championships
2021
 UEC European Track Championships
1st  Madison (with Katie Archibald)
3rd  Elimination
 2nd  Team pursuit, Olympic Games
 UCI Track World Championships
3rd  Team pursuit
3rd  Madison (with Katie Archibald)
2022
 UCI Track World Championships
1st  Points
2nd  Team pursuit
 National Track Championships
1st  Individual pursuit
1st  Points
1st  Madison
Commonwealth Games
2nd  Points
3rd  Individual pursuit
2023
 1st  Team pursuit, UEC European Track Championships

See also
 List of 2016 UCI Women's Teams and riders

References

External links
 

Living people
1990 births
Sportspeople from Renfrewshire
Scottish female cyclists
Scottish track cyclists
Commonwealth Games medallists in cycling
Commonwealth Games silver medallists for Scotland
Commonwealth Games bronze medallists for Scotland
Cyclists at the 2018 Commonwealth Games
Cyclists at the 2022 Commonwealth Games
European Championships (multi-sport event) gold medalists
Cyclists at the 2020 Summer Olympics
Olympic cyclists of Great Britain
Medalists at the 2020 Summer Olympics
Olympic medalists in cycling
Olympic silver medallists for Great Britain
Scottish Olympic medallists
Medallists at the 2018 Commonwealth Games
Medallists at the 2022 Commonwealth Games